Riverside National Cemetery (RNC) is a cemetery located in Riverside, California, dedicated to the interment of United States military personnel. It has been the most active cemetery in the system since 2000, based on the number of interments.

History

The site was selected in 1976 to provide full burial options for Southern California veterans and their families by President Ford’s Commission for National Cemeteries and Monuments. An additional  was transferred by the U.S. Air Force in 2003.

With 15 Medal of Honor recipients in attendance and the Marine Corps’ greatest fighter ace Joe Foss as featured speaker, RNC was dedicated and opened for burials Veterans Day, November 11, 1978. RNC's first burial was Army Staff Sgt. Ysmael Villegas, who was awarded the Medal of Honor for bravery at the cost of his own life at Villa Verde Trail on the island of Luzon in the Philippines, March 20, 1945. Following the war he was buried at Olivewood Cemetery in Riverside. Prior to the opening of RNC, the Veterans Administration asked the Villegas family if he could be honored by re-burial in the new National Cemetery.

The dramatic, meandering landscape features a central boulevard with memorial circles, lakes, indigenous-styled committal shelters, and a memorial amphitheater.

Military funeral honors are provided for eligible veterans by military honor guards from each branch of service, by the California National Guard, and by several volunteer teams collectively known as the Memorial Honor Detail or MHD upon request of family members through their funeral home.

Monuments and Memorials

Riverside National Cemetery is home of the Medal of Honor Memorial, one of four sites in the United States recognized by the U.S. Congress as a National Medal of Honor Memorial Site. The Medal of Honor Memorial, whose walls feature the names of all medal recipients, is located at the third traffic circle in the cemetery. It was dedicated at a ceremony attended by 85 Medal of Honor recipients November 5, 1999.

The statue "Veterans Memorial", created by Colorado sculptor A. Thomas Schomberg, in commemoration of the veterans, their comrades, their personal and emotional sacrifices and to acknowledge those Americans who have lost loved ones in the service of their country. The statue consists of a 12-foot pedestal, on top of which lies the lifeless body of a soldier partially covered with a poncho that hides the face. The unidentified soldier whether a man or woman, private or officer, will forever remain in silent tribute to every American who has given his or her life in combat. The statue was donated to the Riverside National Cemetery by Thomas F. and Judy Kane and was dedicated May 28, 2000.

The Prisoner of War/Missing in Action Memorial was designated a National Memorial by the U.S. Congress on December 10, 2004 and dedicated September 16, 2005. A bronze statue, sculpted by Vietnam veteran Lewis Lee Millett Jr. is the image of an American serviceman on his knees and bound by his captors. The statue is surrounded by black marble pillars, representing imprisonment.

Notable interments

Medal of Honor recipients
 Staff Sergeant Ysmael R. Villegas (1921–1945), (World War II) U.S. Army, Company F, 127th Infantry, 32nd Infantry Division. Villa Verde Trail, Luzon, Philippine Islands, March 20, 1945
 Commander (then Pharmacist's Mate First Class) John H. Balch (1896–1980), (World War I), U.S. Navy, 6th Regiment, U.S. Marines. Vierzy & Somme-Py, France, July 19, 1918 and October 5, 1918
 Colonel (then Platoon Sergeant) Mitchell Paige (1918–2003), (World War II and Korea) U.S. Marine Corps, 1st Marine Division, Solomon Islands, October 26, 1942
 Colonel Lewis Millett (1920–2009), (WW II, Korea, Vietnam) U.S. Army, February 7, 1951
 2d Lieutenant (then Staff Sergeant) Walter D. Ehlers (1921–2014), (World War II) U.S. Army,  June 9–10, 1944

Distinguished Service Cross recipient
 Adelbert Waldron (1933–1995). U.S. Army Vietnam War sniper, credited with the highest number of confirmed kills in the war with 109. A two-time recipient of the Distinguished Service Cross in 1969

General officers
 John Groff (1890–1990). Brigadier General, USMC, and centenarian; recipient of the Navy Cross and Distinguished Service Cross
 Alexander Kreiser (1901–1993). Brigadier General, USMC
 Chesley G. Peterson (1920–1990). Major General, USAF
 George Kenneth Muellner (1943–2019). Lieutenant General, USAF

Tuskegee Airmen

Several members of the legendary Tuskegee Airmen, America's first aviators of African descent, who trained at Alabama's Tuskegee University and flew for the United States Army Air Force, are buried at Riverside National Cemetery.
 1st Lt. John L. Hamilton, USAAF (1919–1982)
 1st Lt. Kenneth R. Hawkins, USAAF (1918–2003)
 Major Charles F. Jamerson, USAF (1917–1996)
 1st Lt. Perry Willis Lindsey, USAF (1922–2004) served during World War II and Korean War
 Chief Warrant Officer John Allen Pulliams Jr., USAF (1919–2002) served during World War II, Korean and Vietnam Wars
 Captain Hackley E. Woodford, M.D., US Army (1914–2005) served during World War II

Others
 John Agar (1921–2002). Actor, once married to Shirley Temple. Starred in Westerns and war movies
 Arthur E. Arling (1906–1991). Hollywood cameraman and cinematographer
 Loyd Arms (1919–1999). NFL left guard
 Robert Edward Badham (1929–2005). Lt. j.g., U.S. Navy. California Congressman from 1977–1989
 George Baker (1915–1975). Tech Sgt., U.S. Army, World War II. Disney cartoonist who created the character "Sad Sack”
 Aaron Bank (1902–2004). Colonel, U.S. Army. Founder of the Army Green Berets. OSS officer
 Lena Mae Basilone née Riggi (1913–1999). Sergeant, USMC Women's Reserve, World War II.  Widow of Medal of Honor and Navy Cross Recipient, John Basilone. Never remarried and declined interment near her husband at Arlington National Cemetery because "she didn't want to cause trouble for everyone."
 Donald Bevan (1920–2013). Playwright
 Augie Blunt (1929–1999). Actor
 Tommy Bond (1926–2005). Actor and TV producer/director. Played “Butch” in the 1930s “Our Gang” or “Little Rascals”. U.S. Navy, WW II
 Stephen E. Burgio (1912–2001). Supreme Court of New York judge and Nuremberg Trials assistant prosecutor 
 Ruth Broe (1911–1983). United States Marine
 Bill Burrud (1925–1990). Child star and travel program host
 Peggy Cartwright (1912–2001). Actress, buried with her United States Army veteran and fellow actor William "Bill" Walker
 Stanley Clements (1926–1981). Actor and comedian
 Paul Comi (1932–2016). Korean War veteran and actor
 Chris Condon (1923–2010). Cinematographer
 Marguerite Courtot (1897–1986). Actress, buried with husband, US Army veteran Raymond McKee
 Edwin A. Doss (1914–2006). World War II and Korean War fighter pilot
 Abel Fernandez (1930–2016). Actor
 Dr. Jerry Graham (1928–1997). US Army veteran and professional wrestler
 Gordon Hahn (1919–2001). California politician
 Bernie Hamilton (1928–2008). Actor
 Jesse James "Mountain" Hubbard (1895–1982). Negro leagues baseball player
 George Clayton Johnson (1929–2015). Novelist and screenwriter
 Will "Dub" Jones (1928–2000). Bass vocalist with The Coasters

 Robert Karvelas (1921–1991). Actor
 Lillian Kinkella Keil (1916–2005). Captain, U.S. Air Force. Flight Nurse pioneer. She flew on 425 combat missions and took part in 11 major campaigns during World War II and the Korea War
 Dick Knight (1929–1991). Professional golfer
 Frank John Lubin (1910–1999). Olympic Athlete. Captain of the gold medal winning 1936 Summer Olympics basketball team. Later introduced the sport to Lithuania, where he is considered the father of Lithuanian basketball 
 James Richard "Jungle Jim" Martin (1924–2002). CPL US Marine Corps, WWII and professional football player
 Raymond McKee (1892–1983). Actor, buried with his wife, actress Marguerite Courtot
 John J. "Bo" Molenda (1905–1986). WWII US Navy Lt and professional football player
 Patsy Montana (1908–1996). American country music singer
 Joe Morris Sr. (1926–2011). World War II United States Marine Corps veteran and Navajo code talker
 Sydney Omarr (1926–2003). Astrologer
 Earl Palmer (1924–2008). Rock & roll and rhythm & blues drummer
 Jim Pash (1948–2005). Musician and recording artist
 Rod Perry (1934–2020). Actor
 Thelma Pressman (1921–2010). Food writer
 Jeff Richards (1924–1989). Minor league baseball player and actor
 Les Richter (1930–2010). American football player and president of the Riverside International Raceway
 Ned Romero (1926–2017). Actor; World War II United States Army corporal
 Ross Russell (1909–2000). Jazz producer and author, founder of Dial Records 
 Bert Shepard (1920–2008). USAAF pilot who was shot down, suffered an amputated leg, and then pitched and coached with the Washington Senators
 Curtis Howe Springer (1896–1985). Radio evangelist and self-proclaimed medicine man
 Woodrow "Woody" Strode (1914–1994). Professional football player and title role actor in the 1960 John Ford movie Sergeant Rutledge
 Felice Taylor (1944–2017). 1960s soul and pop singer.
 Nathaniel Taylor (1938–2019). Actor
 Paul Toth (1935–1999). Major League Baseball pitcher
 Ed Townsend (1929–2003). Songwriter
 Lorenzo Tucker (1907–1986). Stage and screen actor, known as the "Black Valentino"
 Aurel Toma (1911–1980). Romanian boxing champion
 William "Bill" Walker (1896–1992). Film and television actor. Buried with wife, actress Peggy Cartwright
 Jerry Wallace (1927–2008). American country and pop singer
 Michael Waltman (1946–2011). Film and television actor. Vietnam War veteran and Purple Heart recipient
 Noble Willingham, (1931–2004). Television and film actor
 Ellsworth Wisecarver (1929–2005). Known as the "Woo Woo Kid"
 Benny Zientara (1918–1985). Major League Baseball infielder

See also
 List of national memorials of the United States

References

Further reading

External links

 Riverside National Cemetery
 Riverside National Cemetery Support Committee
 
 
 
 Department of Veterans Affairs grave locator
 Riverside National Cemetery USGS Riverside East Quad, California, Topographic Map at TopoZone

1976 establishments in California
Cemeteries in Riverside County, California
Geography of Riverside, California
Military in Riverside County, California
United States national cemeteries
Tourist attractions in Riverside, California